Harold E. Stine (September 21, 1903 - November 2, 1977) was an American film and television cinematographer best known for films including The Incredible Mr. Limpet and The Poseidon Adventure for which he received an Academy Award nomination for Best Cinematography.

Filmography
Man of Conflict (1953)
Girl on the Run (1958)
The Couch (1962)
House of Women (1962)
Black Gold
The Incredible Mr. Limpet (1964)
For Those Who Think Young (1964)
A House Is Not a Home (1964)
The Night Walker (1964)
Johnny Reno (1966)
The Last of the Secret Agents? (1966)
The Busy Body (1967)
The Caper of the Golden Bulls (1967)
Chuka (1967)
The Spirit Is Willing (1967)
Project X (1968)
MASH (1970)
The Todd Killings (1971)
The Poseidon Adventure (1972)

References

1903 births
1977 deaths
American cinematographers